Knut Bjaanaes (born 19 June 1948) is a former Norwegian curler.

He is a champion of the first-ever European Curling Championships, played  and a four-time Norwegian men's curling champion.

Teams

References

External links
 
Scanned by Scan2Net (Curling1963) - Norges Curlingforbund
Scanned by Scan2Net (Curling1964) - Norges Curlingforbund

Living people
1948 births
Norwegian male curlers
European curling champions
Norwegian curling champions
20th-century Norwegian people